The 1931 NFL season was the 12th regular season of the National Football League. The league decreased to 10 teams due to financial hardships caused by the Great Depression: while the Cleveland Indians joined as an expansion team, and the league lost the Minneapolis Red Jackets and the Newark Tornadoes, while the Frankford Yellow Jackets folded midway through the season.

Meanwhile, the Green Bay Packers were named the NFL champions for the third consecutive time after major controversy when they decided to cancel a season-ending game against Portsmouth, which was alleged to have been in order to preserve their first place finish: major rule changes were made in the scheduling of games to prevent any repeat of this incident.

Teams
The league decreased to 10 teams.

Championship race
The two best teams in 1931, the Green Bay Packers and the Portsmouth Spartans, did not face each other that season.  The Spartans would later become the Detroit Lions, and face the Packers regularly, but not in their 14 games in '31.  Green Bay and Portsmouth were both unbeaten at 7–0–0 after seven weeks of play.  In Week Eight, however, the Spartans played two games on the weekend of October 31.  After defeating Frankford 14–0, Portsmouth travelled to New York's Polo Grounds to face the Giants.  A crowd of 32,500 watched the Spartans lose, 14–0.  In Chicago, the Packers beat the Bears, 6–2.  The next week, Portsmouth lost again.  When the Packers were finally beaten in Week Ten, losing 21–13 to the Cardinals and falling to 9–1–0, Portsmouth was at 10–2–0.  In Week Eleven, Portsmouth had a "must win" game against the Cardinals, and was trailing 13–7 at halftime.  Dutch Clark scored a touchdown, but Glenn Presnell's conversion attempt failed, leaving the score at 13–13.  After the Cards went up 20–13, even a tying score would have left the Spartans in second place, but Portsmouth lost 20–19.<ref>"Green Bay Increases Lead On First Place," Portsmouth (O.) Times), Nov 23, 1931, p10</ref>  The same day, Green Bay won at New York, 14–10, and also won on Thanksgiving (38–7 at Providence).  On November 29, Green Bay registered its 12th win, 7–0 at Brooklyn, to clinch the title, meaning a 7–6 loss to the Bears the next week was immaterial.

Standings

References

 NFL Record and Fact Book
 NFL History 1931–1940 (Last accessed December 4, 2005)
 Total Football: The Official Encyclopedia of the National Football League''

National Football League seasons